Peter Shakerley Boston  (10 September 1918 – 19 November 1999) was a British architect and illustrator, best known for the illustrations he made to the books written by his mother, author Lucy M. Boston (1892–1990), who wrote under the name L.M. Boston. The best known of these books were the Green Knowe books. In those illustrations, Peter Boston included items from his mother's home, The Manor in Hemingford Grey, Cambridgeshire, one of the oldest continuously inhabited houses in Britain.

Personal life 
Boston was born in Looe, Cornwall, to Harold and Lucy Maria Boston. Peter's father left his wife in 1935, but the couple's only son continued to live with both.

Boston married Diana Robertson, a widow with two sons, in 1967. They had two children together, Kate and Harriet, and lived in a converted mill in Hertfordshire; however, the Bostons moved into The Manor when Boston's mother died in 1990, making repairs and opening the ancient home to visitors.  Boston's widow, Diana Boston, continues to preside over the house, and was still leading tours in 2010.

Boston served with the Royal Engineers in North Africa in World War II. He received the Military Cross for his service.

Boston died at Ashwell, Hertfordshire.

Architectural career 
Boston began reading Engineering at King's College, Cambridge, but later switched to Architecture, and graduated with a first. He furthered his architectural training at Liverpool University after World War II, and worked as an architect for the rest of his life, even after he began illustrating his mother's books.

Boston joined a firm in 1956 that eventually became Saunders Boston, which had offices in London, Cambridge and Liverpool.  The firm remains in existence in Cambridge. Boston's best-known architectural work are his private homes in Hertfordshire and Cambridgeshire. Amongst Boston's more notable designs are Black Swan House, built in London in 1975 for the Worshipful Company of Vintners but now razed; Gilmerton Court on the Trumpington Road in Cambridge, the Fisher Building at St. John's College, Cambridge and the Mong Building at Sidney Sussex College. In Boston's obituary, The Independent stated, "Boston managed to show sympathy for both neighbours in a design which is intricate, picturesque and self-effacing, housing a music room and other functions."

One of Boston's creations, the house he designed in 1959 for artist Elisabeth Vellacott, sister of classical scholar Philip Vellacott, served as the basis of the home in Rebecca Stott's 2007 novel Ghostwalk.

Illustrator career

In 1939, while Boston was still at university, Lucy Boston bought The Manor, which was to so suffuse the Green Knowe books. Mother and son worked together to refurbish the house, which dates to the time of the Norman Conquest.

Boston's mother based the fictional character Tolly (short for Toseland) on her son Peter. Visitors to the Manor can still see many of the rooms and items that inspired Peter Boston's illustrations. These include the mirror that first greets Tolly and Tolly's magical Japanese mouse of carved wood, which Diana Boston called "the most important thing in the house." Mrs. Boston said that the sight of the toy, a favourite feature of the novels, would provoke adults to nostalgic tears.

In addition to illustrating his mother's books for children, Boston illustrated the dust jackets of L.M. Boston's adult books, Yew Hall (1954) and Persephone (1969).

References

External links 

 A gallery of the real Green Knowe,The Manor at Hemingford Grey
Interview with Diana Boston
 Examples of Boston's illustrations at Google Books
 Saunders Boston Homepage
 Home designed for artist Elisabeth Vellacott, Frances Spalding, The Independent, 27 June 2009. Retrieved 16 January 2010.
 Photograph of the Gilmerton Court flats
 Photograph of the Fisher Building at St. John's College
 Photograph of the Mong Building at Sidney Sussex College
 Dust jacket of Lucy M. Boston's Persephone (1969)
 

1918 births
1999 deaths
English illustrators
20th-century English architects
Alumni of King's College, Cambridge
Alumni of the University of Liverpool
People from Looe
Recipients of the Military Cross
People from Hemingford Grey
Architects from Cornwall
Architects from Cambridgeshire
British Army personnel of World War II
Royal Engineers soldiers